Oseni is a Nigerian surname. Notable people with the surname include:

Ganiyu Oseni (born 1991), Nigerian footballer
Yakubu Oseni (born 1975), Nigerian politician
Zakariyau Oseni (born 1950), Nigerian scholar, imam, and poet 
Waheed Oseni (born 1988), Nigerian footballer

Surnames of Nigerian origin